Nana Yaw Boakye better known by his stage name MOG Music is a Ghanaian contemporary gospel singer, songwriter and a Pastor. He was born on May 14. Married and won the Male Vocalist of the Year 2020 and 2021 Vodafone Ghana Music Awards.

Music career 
MOG Music released his first album in 2016 "New Wine" which earned him African Gospel Music awards Nominations for "Album of the Year" and "Discovery of the Year". He released a single "Making it Big" featuring Sarkodie.

He has collaborated and performed with numerous gospel musicians, including Ohemaa Mercy, Joe Mettle, Denzel Prempeh, Jekalyn Carr, Danny Nettey, Nii Okai, Ron Kenoly. He was awarded the producer of the year at the 2020 VGMA's.

Discography

Live albums
 New Wine (2016)
 Better Me (2018)

Selected Singles
 Be Lifted
 Elohim
 Fakye
 Making It big
 Living God

Awards and nomination

References 

Ghanaian musicians
Living people
Year of birth missing (living people)
Ghanaian gospel singers